The Sasu is a river in the Șureanu Mountains, north of Petroșani, Romania. It is a left tributary of the Strei.

References

Rivers of Romania
Rivers of Hunedoara County